Vladislav Blănuță (born 12 January 2002) is a Moldovan professional footballer who plays as a forward for Liga I club FC U Craiova, on loan from  club Pescara.

Club career
Developed in youth academies of Rapid București and Pescara, Blănuță made his professional debut for the latter on 27 December 2020 in a 3–0 league defeat against Virtus Entella.

On 4 September 2022, Blănuță joined Romanian club FC U Craiova on a season long loan deal.

International career
Blănuță is a current Moldovan youth international.

Personal life
Vladislav is the son of current Moldova women's national team manager Eduard Blănuță.

Career statistics

References

External links
 

2002 births
Living people
People from Hîncești District
Association football forwards
Moldovan footballers
Moldova youth international footballers
Moldova under-21 international footballers
Serie B players
Serie C players
Liga I players
Delfino Pescara 1936 players
FC U Craiova 1948 players
Moldovan expatriate footballers
Moldovan expatriate sportspeople in Italy
Moldovan expatriate sportspeople in Romania
Expatriate footballers in Italy
Expatriate footballers in Romania